Gerry Armstrong may refer to:
Gerry Armstrong (activist) (born 1946), critic and former member of the Church of Scientology
Gerry Armstrong (footballer) (born 1954), Northern Irish footballer

See also
Jerry Armstrong (born 1936), American boxer